A Stranger is a 2013 Croatian drama film directed by Bobo Jelčić.

Cast 
 Bogdan Diklić — Slavko
 Nada Đurevska — Milena
 Ivana Roščić — Zehra
 Rakan Rushaidat — Krešo
 Vinko Kraljević — Milan
 Selma Alispahić — Doorkeeper
 Sadžida Šetić — Neighbour
 Sergej Trifunović — Whiskey Smuggler
 Snježana Martinović — Secretary

Awards
A Stranger won seven Golden Arena awards at the 2013 Pula Film Festival: Best Film, Best Director, Best Actor, Best Actress, Best Screenplay, Best Production Design and Best Cinematography. Also, it won Special Jury Prize at 2013 Sarajevo Film Festival.

References

External links 

2013 drama films
Croatian drama films
2013 directorial debut films
2013 films